This is a list of unique temporary exhibitions held at the Art Gallery of New South Wales, Sydney Australia, organised chronologically and grouped by decade.

Not listed here are the temporary exhibitions that the Gallery hosts regularly, such as the long running Archibald Prize, the Sulman Prize, Wynne Prize and Dobell art prizes.

Touring exhibitions are marked with an asterisk (*).

1900s

1970s

1980s

1990s

2000s

2010s

References

External links
AGNSW site

New South Wales
Art exhibitions in Australia